Birx may refer to:

Birx (surname), includes a list of people with name Birx
Birx, Thuringia, municipality in Germany
Deborah Birx, American doctor and former member of the White House Coronavirus Task Force

See also
Birks (disambiguation)
Brix (disambiguation)